"MonStAR" is a CD single by Japanese singer and voice actress Aya Hirano. It was released on December 5, 2007 and was produced by Lantis. This is Aya Hirano's sixth maxi single and her third and last release from her three-month consecutive single release campaign.

Track listing
 "MonStAR"
 Vocals: Aya Hirano
 Lyrics: meg rock
 Composer: Katsuhiko Kurosu
 Arranger: nishi-ken
 "Love Song"
 "MonStAR" (off vocal)
 "Love Song" (off vocal)

References

2007 singles
Aya Hirano songs
Lantis (company) singles
2007 songs